The Russian Institute for Strategic Studies (RISS) or (RISI) or (RISY) is a Russian research and analytical center formed by decree  by former   Russian Federation President Boris Yeltsin in 1992.

Many of its employees are retired senior Russian foreign intelligence officials appointed by Putin's office.

History
The institute was part of the Foreign Intelligence Service of the Russian Federation until 2009 when it was transferred to the Presidential Administration of Russia and became directly accountable to the President of Russia (Vladimir Putin). Structure of RISS can be found here.

Morozov house

The Russian Institute for Strategic Studies (RISI) was founded on 4 January 2017 with Mikhail Fradkov. The Morozov house at Smolensky Boulevard, 26/9, building 1, underwent improvements under the Office of the Presidential Affairs, which were authorized by Vladimir Putin on 22 February 2017, to become the location of RISI's offices. In 2019, the restoration was completed.

Activities

According to its mission statement, the organization activities include:
Research work
Development of information and analytical materials, proposals, recommendations, expert assessments for state structures of Russia;
Informing political and scientific circles, the public about problems affecting the national security and strategic interests of Russia;
Organization and conduct of scientific-practical conferences, seminars, situational analyzes on priority issues;
Providing information and consulting services.

Leadership
Directors:
1991-1994 -  (Major-General of intelligence: NII-4 at Yubileyny, Chairman of the Board at Dux Factory)
1994-2009 -  (Professor of the Moscow State Institute of International Relations)
2009 - January 4, 2017 - Leonid Reshetnikov (Lieutenant-General SVR retired)
Since January 4, 2017 - Mikhail Fradkov (led SVR from 2007 to 2016; chairman of the board of directors of Almaz-Antey)
Deputy Directors: TS Gusenkova, IV Prokofiev, GG Tishchenko, AV Glazova.
Chief Adviser Konstantin Anatolievich Kokarev.

Criticism
The organization has been described as involved in promoting Russian pro-government views and propaganda.

Ties to secret services
The Moscow Times called RISS the place where old spooks are sent to retire. The authors were unimpressed with the organization's influence, and they explain how they think a former director, Leonid Reshetnikov, drove the institute into the ground. Ivan Nechepurenko of The New York Times said that inside Russia, RISS is known as a "semiretirement refuge for former intelligence officers" and as a place where "ex-intelligence officials can work with dignity".

AIDS
Three RISS deputies with degrees in sociology and historical sciences (and no degrees in medicine) co-authored a report on AIDS, in which they seemed to agree that condoms could cause HIV/AIDS by removing self-protective behavior, and that the true fight was against "drugs and debauchery". The report called statements about the epidemic of AIDS is part of the information war of the West against Russia. It was pointed out that there are two models of HIV: the Western and Moscow. It was noted that the international community asks Russia to use the first approach in the fight against disease and thus forces Russia to use an independent foreign and domestic policy.

Supporting pro-Russian politicians 
The organization has supported pro-Russian politicians in many countries; in some cases to a point it has been accused of interfering with local politics. In 2019 Leonid Reshetnikov was banned from entry to Bulgaria for 10 years for RISS interference in Bulgarian elections.

2016 US presidential election 

In April 2017, Reuters cited several U.S. officials as stating that the RISS had developed a strategy to sway the U.S. election to Donald Trump, and failing that to disillusion U.S. voters with in their democratic system.   
The development of strategy was allegedly ordered by Putin and directed by former officers of Russian Foreign Intelligence Service (SVR), retired SVR general Leonid Petrovich Reshetnikov being head of the RISS at the time. 
The unidentified U.S. officials stated that the propaganda efforts began in March 2016. The first set of recommendations, issued in June 2016, proposed that Russia must support a candidate for U.S. president more favorable to Russia than Obama had been via a social media campaign and through Russia-backed news outlets. Until October it recommended supporting Trump, but about a month before the election, second report was written with the conclusion that Hillary Clinton was likely to win and that a new strategy should be aimed at undermining U.S. voters′ faith in the electoral system.  by disseminating messages claiming voter fraud in the election. RISS director Mikhail Fradkov and Kremlin spokesman Dmitry Peskov denied the allegations.

Ultra-conservative, anti-Western views 
The organization has been described as promoting ultraconservative, anti-Western, anti-liberal views, in particular, anti-LGBT, anti-divorce and anti-abortion views. It has also criticized the introduction of sex education to public schools.

According to Bloomberg View columnist Leonid Bershidsky, under the Reshetnikov rule the institute entered into an alliance with far rights, and Reshetnikov himself is a nationalist close to the milieu who unleashed a pro-Russian rebellion in eastern Ukraine. According to Bershidsky, Putin may agree with them on some points and he uses them informally, but they are far from the only voice Putin listens to.

Anti-Ukrainian views 
The organization has been described as promoting anti-Ukrainian views. In Poland people involved with the Institute encouraged discussion about a Polish-Russian anti-Ukrainian alliance, and proposed that Poland should annex Western Ukraine.

Notes

References

External links
RISS TV, official YouTube channel
And is everything known to Fradkov?
Photo: Oleg Evgenievich Lushnikov
Russian experts called Reshetnikov's words "provocation", outraged by the Belarusian Foreign Ministry (December 22, 2016). MK.ru

Government agencies established in 1992
1992 establishments in Russia
Organizations associated with Russian interference in the 2016 United States elections
Russian propaganda organizations